"Live Is Life" is a 1984 song by Austrian pop rock band Opus. It was released as the first single from their first live album, Live Is Life (1984), and was also included on the US version of their fourth studio album, Up and Down (1984). The song was a European number-one hit in the summer of 1985, and also reached number one in Canada and the top 40 in the US in 1986. It has been covered by many artists.

Background and chart performance
After having released several singles, "Live Is Life" achieved huge success in 1985, topping the charts of many countries, including Austria (eight weeks), West Germany, France (seven weeks) and Sweden (four weeks).

The song was created during a concert in Oberwart, on 2 September 1984, while the group celebrated its eleventh anniversary. It was recorded in a live version with the audience singing along in the verses. In the lyrics, the song expresses "the enthusiastic attachment of the group to the stage". The song was performed during the 1985 charity campaign, "Austria für Afrika".

In 1994, on the occasion of the 1994 FIFA World Cup, Opus released another version of "Live Is Life", which made it again into the top ten in Austria. The song was re-recorded once more by the group in 2008, both in a solo version and featuring Jerry.

Maradona's warm up
On 19 April 1989, during the warming up in Munich before the UEFA Cup semi-final return between FC Bayern Munich and S.S.C. Napoli, Diego Maradona did a keepie uppie exhibition, to the rhythm of the song, while the song was heard on the stadium's loudspeakers.

Some confusion persists by those who dispute that it took place in Munich. Among others, Jürgen Klinsmann claimed that it happened during the final in Stuttgart:There were 70,000 people in the stadium and Maradona went on the field. We’re on the other side of the field, warming up like Germans: seriously, focused. There's music playing, the song "Live is Life", and to the rhythm of the song Maradona started juggling the ball. So we stopped our warm-up. What's this guy doing? He's juggling off his shoulders. And we couldn't warm up anymore because we had to watch this guy.

Belgian sports anchor Frank Raes, who edited the video and distributed it via YouTube, has asserted that this warm up took place just before the semifinal in Munich. By 2013, Raes' video clip had garnered almost two million views on YouTube. The 25th anniversary of Maradona's warming up was noted internationally, with newspapers commenting on his skills and on the transformative effect he had on Napoli and southern Italy.

Track listings

1985 release
7" single (1984 release)
"Live Is Life" – 4:15
"Again and Again" – 3:51
 
7" single (1985 release)
"Live Is Life" – 4:15
"Up and Down" – 3:49

1994 release
CD maxi
"The Power of Live Is Life" (Bingoboys radio mix) – 3:58
"Live Is Life" (original version) – 5:06
"The Power of Live Is Life" (Bingoboys club mix) – 6:33
"Live Is Life" (radio version) – 3:16

2008 release
CD single
"Live Is Life 08" (reggae version) – 4:17
"Live Is Life 08" (rock version) – 3:38
 
CD maxi
"Live Is Life 08" (reggae version) – 4:17
"Live Is Life 08" (rock version) – 3:38
"Live Is Life 08" (reggaeton version) – 3:56
"Touch the Sky" by Opus – 3:47

2011 version
Digital download
Live Is Life (digitally remastered) [single version] – 4:09
Live Is Life (opera version) [live version] – 4:57

Charts and sales

Weekly charts

1 "The Power of Live Is Life"
2 "Live Is Life 08", featuring Jerry (in Austria)

Year-end charts

Certifications

Hermes House Band version

The Hermes House Band and DJ Ötzi released a version of the song in 2002. The single had its highest peak position in France, where it reached number two for five weeks. The song was used as a soundtrack for the German youth film Das Jahr der ersten Küsse. As of August 2014, the song was the 23rd best-selling single of the 21st century in France, with 537,000 units sold.

Track listings
CD single
"Live Is Life (Here We Go)" (Here We Go/video mix) – 3:30
"Live Is Life (Here We Go)" (jump mix) – 3:33

CD maxi
"Live Is Life (Here We Go)" (Here We Go/video mix) – 3:30
"Live Is Life (Here We Go)" (jump mix) – 3:33
"Football's Coming Home" (three lions) (radio) by Hermes House Band – 3:48
"Everytime You Touch Me" (fireplace mix) by Hermes House Band – 3:21
"Hey Mama" by Hermes House Band – 3:10
Enhanced Multimediatrack : "Live Is Life" – 3:30

Charts and sales

Weekly charts

Year-end charts

Sales and certifications

Other cover versions
The song was covered by Stargo, whose version reached number 10 in France in 1985. Sofia Carson's "Love Is the Name" features an interpolation of "Live Is Life".

See also
List of number-one hits of 1985 (Germany)
List of number-one singles of 1985 (France)
List of number-one singles of 1985 (Spain)
List of number-one singles and albums in Sweden

References

1984 songs
1984 singles
1985 singles
1994 singles
2002 singles
2008 singles
English-language Austrian songs
Opus (Austrian band) songs
Hermes House Band songs
DJ Ötzi songs
Number-one singles in Austria
Number-one singles in Germany
Number-one singles in Sweden
SNEP Top Singles number-one singles
Polydor Records singles
Universal Records singles